A central military commission or national defense commission is an organization typical of socialist one-party states espousing communism responsible for the ruling party's control of the nation's armed forces. In a way, its functions are similar to national security councils. 

Examples of existing CMCs can be found for example in China, North Korea and Vietnam.  In China and North Korea both CMCs are the same and have equal power over the military. But in  Vietnam only the party CMC controls the armed forces.

People's Republic of China
 Central Military Commission of the Chinese Communist Party (party)
 Central Military Commission of the People's Republic of China (state counterpart)

Democratic People's Republic of Korea
 Central Military Commission of the Workers' Party of Korea (party)
 National Defence Commission of the Democratic People's Republic of Korea (state counterpart)

Socialist Republic of Vietnam
 Central Military Commission of the Communist Party of Vietnam (party)
 Council for National Defense and Security (Vietnam) (state counterpart)

In Kuomintang-ruled China, there was also a central military commission. This was because the KMT, even though anti-communist ideologically, had modeled itself on the Communist Party of the Soviet Union organizationally as Chiang Kai-shek thought that it was an effective model of organization for a one-party state, as China was at the time.
 National Military Council defunct Chinese KMT committee (disbanded in 1947 when the army was nationalized and no longer belonged to the KMT)

Military sociology